The following highways are numbered 741:

Costa Rica
 National Route 741

United States
  Maryland Route 741
  Ohio State Route 741
  Pennsylvania Route 741
  Puerto Rico Highway 741